The Towson Tigers football team represents Towson University in the National Collegiate Athletic Association (NCAA) Division I Football Championship Subdivision (FCS). In its 47 years as a program, the team has played in nearly 500 games, including 6 post-season appearances. The Tigers have played at all three levels of NCAA football (DIII, DII, and DI) and are the only collegiate team to make the postseason at all three levels.

Seasons

References

Towson
Towson Tigers football seasons